JW may refer to:

Jack Wills, a clothing company
Jehovah's Witnesses, a Christian religious group
John Wick, an action film starring Keanu Reeves
Joko Widodo, 7th President of Indonesia, 16th Governor of Jakarta and 15th Mayor of Surakarta
Jurassic World, 2015 adventure film by Colin Trevorrow
Jurassic World (franchise), the Jurassic World franchise originating with the 2015 film
JW, a patient with a "split brain"
The Jewish War, history book by Josephus
Vanilla Air (2013-2019, IATA code JW), a Japanese airline
Arrow Air (1947-2010, IATA code JW), an American cargo airline
⟨jʷ⟩, IPA for a labialized palatal approximant

See also
 WJ (disambiguation)